Harry Cleaver Jr. (born 21 January 1944) is an American scholar, Marxist theoretician, and professor emeritus at the University of Texas at Austin. He is best known as the author of Reading Capital Politically, an autonomist reading of Karl Marx's Capital. Cleaver is currently active in the Zapatista movement in Chiapas, Mexico.

Education
Cleaver began his undergraduate studies at Antioch College in 1962, graduating with a bachelor's degree in economics in 1967. At Antioch, Cleaver became involved in the American Civil Rights Movement and began his lifelong engagement with political activism. From 1964 to 1965, Cleaver studied abroad at the University of Montpellier where he engaged with the Union Nationale des Étudiants de France. In 1967, Cleaver enrolled at Stanford University to begin a PhD in economics. While at Stanford, Cleaver was active in the Anti-war Movement. As a student activist opposed to the Vietnam War, Cleaver protested the Stanford Research Institute's alleged connection to the United States Department of Defense, which became the impetus for his dissertation research into the connections between the Green Revolution and social engineering. Cleaver's frustrations with mainstream economic theory during this period in his studies led him to embrace Marxism.

Career

Teaching
In 1971, Cleaver was hired as an assistant professor at the Université de Sherbrooke in Montreal, Quebec where he taught for three years, finished his dissertation, and studied Québécois nationalism. From 1974 to 1976, Cleaver was a visiting assistant professor at the New School for Social Research in the department of economics. In 1976, Cleaver took a position in the economics department of the University of Texas at Austin where he taught for 36 years, retiring in 2012.

Partial bibliography

Books

Articles

References

External links
Harry Cleaver's personal website
aut-op-sy email list
Harry Cleaver at libcom.org
Harry Cleaver Study Guide to Marx's Capital Volume 1
Reading Capital Politically by Harry Cleaver

1944 births
Living people
Autonomism
American Marxists
Marxian economists
Marxist theorists
Marxist writers
University of Texas at Austin faculty
Antioch College alumni
University of Montpellier alumni
Stanford University alumni